Anaplous or Promotou was a town of ancient Thrace on the Bosphorus, inhabited during Byzantine times. 

Its site is tentatively located near Arnavutköy in European Turkey.

References

Populated places in ancient Thrace
Former populated places in Turkey
Populated places of the Byzantine Empire
History of Istanbul Province